"Double Trouble" is a blues song written and recorded by Chicago blues guitarist Otis Rush in 1958.  Since its release as a single in 1959, the song has been recorded by several blues and other artists, including several versions by Eric Clapton.  Stevie Ray Vaughan named his band "Double Trouble" after Rush's song.  In 2008, Rush's original version was inducted into the Blues Foundation Hall of Fame, who called it a "minor-key masterpiece".

Original song
"Double Trouble" is a slow tempo twelve-bar blues notated in 4/4  time in the key of D minor.  According to biographer Don Snowden, "The song's underlying air of quiet desperation stretched to the breaking point is enhanced by brilliant use of dynamics and some truly mind-boggling, strangled guitar fills near the end."  According to Otis Rush, the song's title was inspired by a comment by a woman upon viewing her hand during a card game "trouble, trouble, trouble, trouble, double troubles".

The song was produced by Willie Dixon and features Rush on guitar and vocal, Dixon on bass, Ike Turner on second guitar, Little Brother Montgomery on piano, Harold Ashby and Jackie Brenston on saxophones, and Billy Gayles on drums. Although Rush plays the lead guitar introduction to the song, Turner plays the signature vibrato guitar parts.  In 1986, Rush recorded a live version of the song for Blues Interaction – Live in Japan 1986, which was released in 1989.

References

1959 singles
Otis Rush songs
Blues songs
Eric Clapton songs
Songs written by Otis Rush
1958 songs
Cobra Records singles